The JC Raulston Arboretum is a  arboretum and botanical garden administered by North Carolina State University, and located in Raleigh, North Carolina. It is open daily to the public without charge.

History 

The Arboretum was established in 1976 by horticulturist Dr. James Chester Raulston, and after Dr. Raulston's death in 1996, the Arboretum was re-named in his honor.

Plant collections 

The arboretum has a collection of plants from over 50 countries. Its plant collections now include over 6,000 total taxa of annuals, perennials, bulbs, vines, ground covers, shrubs, and trees, with significant collections of:
Acer (maple)
Aesculus (buckeye)
Berberis (barberry)
Buxus (boxwood)
Cercis (redbud)
Conifers
Ilex (holly)
Magnolia (magnolia)
Mahonia (grapeholly)
Nandina (heavenly bamboo)
Quercus (oak)
Styracaceae (silverbell family)
Viburnum
Wisteria

The major gardens

 Annual Color Trials — an official All-America Selections (AAS) testing site, evaluating over 700 different annuals and tender perennials each year.
 Entry Garden — more than 100 types of tender perennials, mostly tropical.
 Finley-Nottingham Rose Garden — over 200 roses representing over 120 taxa, including hybrid teas, hybrid musk roses, David Austin roses, and climbing roses.
 Japanese Garden — Japanese plants with a raked-stone Zen garden; plants include Acer palmatum ‘Kiyohime’, Acer palmatum ‘Seiryu’, Chamaecyparis obtusa ‘Nana Gracilis’, Lagerstroemia fauriei, Nandina domestica f. capillaris cultivars, and Pinus taeda ‘Nana’.
 Klein-Pringle White Garden — white-flowered plants and plants with gray, white, or silver foliage, inspired by the famous White Garden at Sissinghurst Castle Garden; plants include  Acer palmatum, Lagerstroemia ‘Natchez’, Magnolia × loebneri ‘Merrill’, Styrax japonicus ‘Emerald Pagoda’, and Viburnum ‘Mohawk’.
 Lath House — over 700 kinds of shade-loving plants, including Acanthus spinosus, Cornus controversa 'Variegata', Farfugium japonicum 'Aureomaculatum', Gentiana saponaria, Hydrangea macrophylla ‘Pia’, Pieris japonica ‘Shojo’, and Trochodendron aralioides.
 Mixed Border — a large border planting (300 × 15 feet) (91 × 4.6 m) of trees, shrubs, groundcovers, perennials, and bulbs; plants include Campsis grandiflora 'Morning Calm', Chamaecyparis thyoides 'Rubicon', Clematis 'Betty Corning', Cornus sericea 'Silver and Gold', and Hamamelis × intermedia ‘Jelena’.
 Model Gardens — home demonstration gardens.
 Paradise Garden — for the senses of sight, sound, taste, touch, and smell; plants include Aloysia triphylla, Corylus avellana ‘Contorta’, Hosta ‘Sum and Substance’, and Ziziphus jujuba ‘Inermis’.
 Perennial Border — nearly 1,000 plants in a large border planting (450 × 18 feet) (140 × 5.5 m), with color scheme based upon a plan by Gertrude Jekyll.
 Southall Memorial Garden — a hemlock tree grove, with mixed plantings and an open grassy area for gatherings.
 Xeric Garden — plants from Mexico and the American Southwest, including Agave, Dasylirion, Echinocactus, Hesperaloe, Nolina, Opuntia, and Yucca.
 Winter Garden — plants at their best in winter, including Cryptomeria, Chamaecyparis, Cornus officinalis 'Kintoki', Edgeworthia chrysantha, Epimedium, Hamamelis, Helleborus × hybridus, Ilex, Iris unguicularis, Prunus mume 'Rose Glow', and Yucca.

See also 
 List of botanical gardens in the United States

References

External links 
 JC Raulston Arboretum website
 Guide to the J. C. Raulston Papers 1930-2006

Arboreta in North Carolina
Botanical gardens in North Carolina
North Carolina State University
Parks in Raleigh, North Carolina
1976 establishments in North Carolina